The Europuddle (French: Europuddle, German: Europfütze), is a fountain completed in November 2019, located in the Europaallee area in the city centre of Zürich, Switzerland.  Its name is a portmanteau derived from "Europaallee", the residential and commercial area in which it belongs, and "puddle", due to its visual appearance. Unlike a traditional fountain, the Europuddle is contained on only one side by slightly elevated white pavement stone. The tarmacadam surface beneath the water slopes gently towards the elevated pavement, making the body of water visually similar to a puddle.

{
  "type": "Feature",
  "geometry": { "type": "Point", "coordinates": [8.5307452, 47.3792739] },
  "properties": {
    "title": "Europuddle",
    "marker-size": "medium",
    "marker-color": "0050d0"
  }
}

Construction 
The Europuddle is about 10 meters wide and 60 meters long, with a maximum depth of about 20 centimeters. Seven identical water jets at the western edge of the Europuddle create a fountain by jetting water eastward into the puddle.

The jets of water alternate between three states :

 off: in the absence of flowing water jets, the Europuddle is transformed into a mirror of water reflecting surrounding buildings.
 static: the jets have equal, constant water flow, creating wavelets on the surface of the puddle.
 animated: the water jets vary their flow rate, creating animated ripple effects on the water body.

Cost 
The cost of constructing the Europuddle is believed to be ~140 million Swiss franc

References 

Buildings and structures in Switzerland
Architecture in Switzerland
Fountains in Switzerland